is a Japanese professional boxer from Akō, Hyōgo. He previously held IBF super bantamweight world title.

Professional boxing career
Oguni made his pro debut on November 8, 2009, winning his first ten fights before losing to his countryman Shingo Wake in 2013 for the OPBF super bantamweight title. On December 31, 2016, he defeated Dominican super bantamweight champion Jonathan Guzmán to win the IBF super bantamweight title in Shimadzu Arena Kyoto, Japan.

See also
List of super-bantamweight boxing champions
List of Japanese boxing world champions

References

External links

|-

Living people
1988 births
Japanese male boxers
Super-bantamweight boxers
World super-bantamweight boxing champions
International Boxing Federation champions
Sportspeople from Hyōgo Prefecture
21st-century Japanese people